Flora Corpuz Eufemio (born April 14, 1926) was appointed Vice-Chairperson of the United Nations Convention on the Rights of the Child in 1996.

Education
She received her Bachelor of Arts in English and Minor in Political Science from the Far Eastern University in 1950 and her master's degree in Social Work from the University of the Philippines in 1967.

External links 
 Election of Five Members of the Committee on the Rights of the Child : . 12/06/1996

Possibly living people
Filipino officials of the United Nations
1926 births
Far Eastern University alumni
University of the Philippines alumni